Wuju, also known as Jinhua opera, is a form of Chinese opera from Jinhua, in the eastern province of Zhejiang, China. It is also performed in Lishui, Linhai, Jiande, Chun'an, Zhejiang, as well as in northeastern Jiangxi province, in cities such as Yushan, Shangrao, Guixi, Boyang, and Jingdezhen. It is named for Wuzhou, an ancient name for Jinhua.

There are eleven Wuju troupes in eastern China.

References

External links
Introduction to Wuju opera on Quzhou government web site

Chinese opera
Culture in Zhejiang
Jinhua